Michael Jackson: The Experience is a music video game based on Michael Jackson's songs. It was developed and published by Ubisoft, and was released on 23 November 2010 in North America, 25 November 2010 in Australia and 26 November 2010 in Europe for the Nintendo DS, PlayStation Portable, and Wii. It was also released on 12 April 2011 in North America, 14 April 2011 in Australia and 15 April 2011 in Europe for PlayStation 3's PlayStation Move and Xbox 360's Kinect. The Japanese release on 8 December 2011 only revised the PlayStation 3, Xbox 360, and Wii consoles. The game features many of Michael Jackson's hits, such as "Bad", "Thriller", "Beat It", "Billie Jean", "Smooth Criminal", "Black or White", "The Way You Make Me Feel", etc. However, some songs like "Man in the Mirror" and "P.Y.T. (Pretty Young Thing)" are excluded. Initial launches of the game included a limited edition replica of Jackson's sequined glove. It was later released for the Nintendo 3DS on 7 November 2011 in North America and 11 November 2011 in Europe, for iPhone and iPad on 7 December 2011 in North America and for PlayStation Vita on 15 February 2012 in North America, 22 February 2012 in Europe and 23 February 2012 in Australia. It was announced that the game would be released on Mac OS X, and iPad 2. The game sold 2 million units in two months, not including Japanese sales, making it one of the best-selling Wii title games.

Gameplay

Wii 
The Wii version of the game features Just Dance-style gameplay, thus serving as a spin-off title. There are three modes of gameplay in this version. The first mode of gameplay is "Classic" where all players follow Michael Jackson's choreographed routine on-screen. The second mode of gameplay is "Duo" which is used for duets (e.g., "The Girl Is Mine") or videos with two main characters (e.g., "The Way You Make Me Feel" and "In the Closet"). Two players take the role of Jackson, while the other two play as the other character. The third mode of gameplay is "Crew", which features Jackson and two backup dancers. One player dances as Jackson, while the other three are the backup dancers, or if optional, all players play as the backup dancers. All pictograms in this game move from bottom to top. After performing songs, players are able to unlock training videos in the "Dance School" where they are taught some of the more difficult moves from several of Jackson's music videos and stage performances.

Nintendo DS 
The Nintendo DS version features gameplay similar to Elite Beat Agents. In this version, there is a cartoon version of Jackson on the top screen and the player follows along by tapping the bottom screen with the stylus to the rhythm of the music. Also in the Nintendo DS version, there is an anti-piracy feature created by Ubisoft that will freeze the game and replace the audio with the sound of vuvuzelas (popularized by the South Africans in World Cup 2010) if the player is playing a pirated or ROM version of the game.

PlayStation Portable 
In the PlayStation Portable version, the player follows Jackson by pressing the action buttons when it hits the circle. The gameplay style and songs are the same as the DS version, but there are more songs than the DS version of the game, such as "Will You Be There" and "Rock With You". There is still the Show Time part of each song, but when the player spins a wheel to light up Jackson's stage, it is replaced with the screen telling the player to press the L and R button as fast as possible.

Kinect 

The Kinect version of the game features full body tracking, and entirely different 
choreography from the Wii version, meaning like the Dance Central series, along with several other changes and additions. This version uses a technology called Player Projection, which puts the player's own image in the game allowing them to star in their own Michael Jackson video. The Kinect version includes two game modes: "Solo" and "Party". Solo mode features one player. Party mode features 2-4 players. There are two options in Party mode: "Co-Op" and "Battle". Co-Op mode is an "every player for themselves" mode as players take turns jumping in and jumping out in order to complete the song. Battle mode is a team mode where two teams face off to get the highest score. Battle mode is a little different from Co-Op mode as each team performs the song together and the song gets broken down into two parts in which one player dances and the other player sings. Party mode only features Dance Mode, Performance Mode and Master Performance Mode. There are four symbols to represent each player: Jackson's glove, Jackson's hat, Jackson's shades and one of Jackson's jackets. Several of the songs in the game do not feature any moves to perform, instead becoming "Singing Only" songs, with "Earth Song" being the first song confirmed as Singing Only. There are certain songs that have moves that can be taught in a practice mode called "MJ School". During each performance, a crown pops up above the player's head and the player must hit the crown to activate "King Power" before it fades away. The crown, appearing only once per song, will multiply the score by 8. Similar to the Wii version, the player is scored on how well they sing and dance. The player can get five different grades: "Perfect", "Good" and "OK" increases the player's score, while "Almost" and "Miss" make causes the player to lose their current score. Points add up at the end of each song along with the rating of stars the player receives and a photo the player takes during their performance. Players can either use the Kinect's built-in microphone, an attached mic/headset or the Xbox 360 Wireless Microphone for karaoke (much like the Lips series). The game does include the option, however, to choose a "Dance Only" version of the song, which means the player will not be asked to sing. The Kinect version also features a mode known as Master Performance, which requires the player to both sing and dance to a set of choreographed moves that are harder than the normal moves, and "as close as possible to the videos".

PlayStation 3 
The PlayStation 3 version features the same gameplay as the Wii version. In addition to the singing and dancing functionalities found in the Kinect version, this version allows the player to sing or dance at the same time as other players. There is also the option to record the video clips or take pictures of the player's performance, and allows the player to save or upload them to sites, such as Facebook. In this version of the game, all the songs from the Wii version are included, but new songs such as "Stranger in Moscow" and "I Just Can't Stop Loving You" are added, making it slightly different to the Wii version of the game.

Nintendo 3DS 

In the Nintendo 3DS version, there is a CGI version of Jackson on the top screen, and the player draws different shapes with the stylus on the bottom screen to follow along.

PlayStation Vita and iOS 
The PlayStation Vita and iOS versions were ported with Improved graphics in HD, Multiplayer (AD-Hoc), Trophy Support, Motion Sensor support, Multi-touch support, and instead of taking off the on-screen notes, it was replaced with the ability to use the rear touch pad for an even harder challenge and since its use the multi-touch, the difficulty has been given an upgrade to increase the challenge. The PS Vita and iOS versions, compared to the 3DS version, has been given a whole new look in graphics and on resolution, with the player being able to use their finger instead of a 3DS stylus. The Vita and iOS versions do not have any downloadable content.

List of songs 

 A "*" indicates that there is a dance teaching video of that song.
 A "**" indicates that there is a three-part dance teaching video of that song.

All of the songs from the album Invincible are excluded from the game.

In the Wii version of the game, "Money" is incorrectly credited as a song from the album Blood on the Dance Floor: HIStory in the Mix which was released in 1997. This would be true if the song in the game was the remix but it is the original version of the song, released on HIStory: Past, Present and Future, Book I in 1995.

"Another Part of Me" is exclusive to copies of the game sold by Walmart.

Development 
Roughly two weeks after Michael Jackson's death in 2009, MJ Productions announced that a Michael Jackson game had been in development for several months.

The game was displayed at New York Comic Con at Ubisoft's booth.

Reception 

Michael Jackson: The Experience was met with generally mixed reviews, with most of them citing the varied differences between the different versions of the game. The reviews for the DS and PSP versions were above average, with a slightly better score for the DS version. IGN gave a 6.5/10 for DS and 5.5/10 for the PSP. Destructoid gave a 6/10 for the DS version.

IGN gave the Wii version a 3.5 saying that it does not give clear instructions on how to dance and also criticized the controls. Metro gave it 5/10, describing it as "perfectly good party fun if you don't care that the controls don't work." VideoGamer.com gave the review a 7/10, stating that the music overplays the responsiveness difficulty. CNET gave the game 5/5, writing that the game is "extremely easy to pick up and play" and "the choreography is amazing" The Escapist gave the game 4/5, noting that the game "is not meant to be played by yourself".

Eurogamer thought that the dance routines in the Xbox 360 game "feel a little slower and more simplistic than those in the PS3 game".

See also 
 Michael Jackson-related games

References 

2010 video games
Dance video games
Karaoke video games
Cancelled Windows games
IOS games
Wii games
Nintendo DS games
Nintendo 3DS games
Xbox 360 games
PlayStation 3 games
PlayStation Portable games
PlayStation Vita games
MacOS games
PlayStation Move-compatible games
Just Dance (video game series)
Kinect games
Michael Jackson-related games
Music video games
Video games based on musicians
Video games developed in France
Video games developed in Canada
Video games developed in Brazil
Video games developed in Italy
Ubisoft games